Wnion Halt (Pron: Oon-y'n) in Gwynedd, Wales, was on the Ruabon to Barmouth line. The station was situated in a narrow part of the Wnion Valley next to Pont Llanrhaiadr and squeezed against a road retaining wall on the north side of the line. There was a short timber-edged platform with a timber shelter and nameboard. There was no passing place or freight activity here. 
Today rusted platform supports remain and the entrance gate is part of a driveway to a private residence to the east of the halt.

Neighbouring stations

References

Further reading

External links
 Wnion Halt on navigable 1946 O.S. map

Beeching closures in Wales
Railway stations in Great Britain opened in 1933
Railway stations in Great Britain closed in 1965
1933 establishments in England
1965 disestablishments in England
Disused railway stations in Gwynedd
Brithdir and Llanfachreth
Former Great Western Railway stations